Puerto Nare is a town and municipality in the Colombian department of Antioquia.

Demographics
Total Population: 17.539 inhabitants. (2009)
 Urban Population: 7.128
 Rural Population: 10.411
Literacy: 80.7% (2005)
 Urban Zones: 83.3%
 Rural Zones: 79.1%

References

Municipalities of Antioquia Department